Oberdischingen is a municipality in Alb-Donau-Kreis in Baden-Württemberg.

Geography

Geographical location
Oberdischingen is located on the Danube between Ehingen (9 km) and Ulm (18 km).

Neighbouring communities
The municipality is bordering to the north by to the district Niederhofen of  Allmendingen, to the east and south to the city of  Erbach and to the west to Öpfingen.

History
Oberdischingen was first mentioned in documents in 1148. The as Malefizschenk known Franz Ludwig Schenk von Castell (1736-1821) built here his prison. Most famous inmate of the prison was the  Vagantin  and  crook  Elisabetha Gaßner, which was executed here on January 17, 1788. In 1806 Oberdischingen - like the entire area - came to Württemberg.

Religions

Since 1275 Oberdischingen has its own parish.
Oberdischingen is predominantly Catholic.

Politics

Mayors

 1930 years: Josef Schlick
 1948-1952: Erich Klumpp
 1952-1956: Vincent Ströbele
 1956-1983: Alois Speiser
 1983-1997: Hans chisels
 1997-2014: Benno Droste
 Since 2014: Friedrich Nägele

Traffic
Oberdischingen is connected by the Bundesstraße 311 to the national road network.

Educational institutions

Oberdischingen has a  primary, and  Werkrealschule.

Leisure and sports facilities

In Oberdischingen there are two football fields and four tennis courts.

Things

Oberdischingen is located on the Upper Swabian Baroque Route. The exceptional historic center is well worth seeing: Houses in French baroque  Mansard - style were built by Franz Ludwig Count Schenk von Castell (1736-1821).

References

Alb-Donau-Kreis
Württemberg